Ismael Orot is a Ugandan politician. He was named as State Minister for Works in the Ugandan Cabinet on 6 June 2016. However, his appointment was rejected by the parliamentary appointments committee. He served as the elected Member of Parliament for Kanyum County, in Kumi District in the 10th Parliament.

References

External links
Website of the Parliament of Uganda

Living people
People from Kumi District
Members of the Parliament of Uganda
Government ministers of Uganda
National Resistance Movement politicians
People from Eastern Region, Uganda
Year of birth missing (living people)
21st-century Ugandan politicians